The following lists events that happened during the 1600s in South Africa.

Events
 1594 - 1601 - James Lancaster, an English navigator, explores the southern African coast and establishes trade relationships with the Khoikhoi
 20 March 1602 - the Vereenigde Oost-Indische Compagnie (VOC) or better known as the Dutch East India Company is established in the Netherlands
 1608 - The Portuguese ship, Santo Esperitu, is believed to have been shipwrecked off the eastern coast of South Africa

References
See Years in South Africa for list of References

History of South Africa